Mohammad Omar Shairzaad was selected to represent Kandahar Province in Afghanistan's Meshrano Jirga, the upper house of its National Legislature, in 2005.  A report on Kandahar prepared at the Navy Postgraduate School stated he is from the "head of the Esteqlal (Independence) movement".  It states he sits on the Petitions Committee.  It states he has a bachelor's degree.

References

Politicians of Kandahar Province
Living people
Members of the House of Elders (Afghanistan)
Year of birth missing (living people)